Kaibab Lake is located about  northeast of Williams in North Central Arizona.
Camping is permitted at the campgrounds managed by the Public Lands Interpretive Association.

Fish species

 Rainbow Trout
 Largemouth Bass
 Sunfish
 Catfish (Channel)
 Black crappie
 Bluegill

References

External links

Arizona Boating Locations Facilities Map
Arizona Fishing Locations Map
Video of Kaibab Lake

Lakes of Arizona
Lakes of Coconino County, Arizona